Petre Roşca (22 October 1922 – 1981) was a Romanian equestrian and Olympic medalist. He was born in Ploiești. He competed in dressage at the 1980 Summer Olympics in Moscow, where he won a bronze medal with the Romanian team, along with Anghelache Donescu and Dumitru Velicu. He also placed eleventh in individual dressage at the 1980 Olympics.

References

External links

1922 births
1981 deaths
Sportspeople from Ploiești
Romanian male equestrians
Romanian dressage riders
Olympic equestrians of Romania
Olympic bronze medalists for Romania
Equestrians at the 1980 Summer Olympics
Olympic medalists in equestrian
Medalists at the 1980 Summer Olympics